Tīna Graudiņa (born 9 March 1998 in Riga, Latvia) is a Latvian beach volleyball player. She represented Latvia at the 2020 Summer Olympics. Graudiņa and her partner Anastasija Kravčenoka were the first Latvian women's pair to qualify for the Olympics. She and Kravčenoka came in fourth at the Tokyo Olympics. Tīna Graudiņa was also named the best all-around scorer at the Tokyo Olympics.

Graudiņa won the 2019 European Championship, and earned gold at the 2016 U22 European Championship with partner Anastasija Kravčenoka. In 2018 she also won silver at the U22 European Championship and was named FIVB Rookie of the Year.

Previously, Graudiņa won gold at the 2015 U18 European Championship with partner Paula Neciporuka.

Tīna Graudiņa plays for the University of Southern California (USC). In her career at USC, she had many accomplishments:
 2021 and 2022 NCAA women's beach volleyball championships
 2019 National Player of the Year
 All-American first team, in 2018, 2019 and 2021
 91–8 career record (31–2 in 2018, 33–2 in 2019, 27–4 in 2021)

Personal life
Graudiņa's grandfather Artūrs Graudiņš was a Latvian high jump champion. Her grandmother Staņislava Spruženiece was a Latvian high jump champion.

References

External links 
 
 
 
 
 
 Tīna Graudina at Volleybox
 Tina Graudina Claims Latvian Title with Anastasija Kravcenoka
 Tina Graudina in her own words

1998 births
Living people
Latvian beach volleyball players
Latvian women's volleyball players
Beach volleyball players at the 2020 Summer Olympics
Olympic beach volleyball players of Latvia
USC Trojans women's beach volleyball players
Sportspeople from Riga
European Games competitors for Latvia
Beach volleyball players at the 2015 European Games
Beach volleyball players at the 2014 Summer Youth Olympics
21st-century Latvian women